Bellflower High School is a six-year public high school located in Bellflower, California, as part of the Bellflower Unified School District (BUSD).

Demographics and class size
As of 2009, Bellflower had 136 regular educations teachers and 123 classrooms serving 3,342 students from the communities of Lakewood, Bellflower, Downey, and Cerritos.  Average class size is 25 students.

Activities
The school mascot is the "Buccaneer"—illustrated as a pirate with an eyepatch. The school colors are maroon and gold. The monthly school newspaper is the Treasure Map.

The school produced digital format of yearbooks from 1951 to 2001 on Yearbook CDs.

Notable alumni
Dick Ackerman (born 1942), California State Senate Republican Leader
Chris Carter (born 1956), television screenwriter and producer. Creator of The X-Files
Ed Dickson (born 1987), National Football League tight end, Super Bowl XLVII champion
John Gesek (born 1963), National Football League offensive lineman, two-time Super Bowl champion, he transferred after his junior year.
Daniel J. Kim (born 1976), CEO of frozen yogurt chain Red Mango
Bobby Lane (born 1939), National Football League linebacker, 1963 AFL champion
Bob Lee (born 1937), Major League Baseball player
Billy Rohr (born 1945), Major League Baseball pitcher for Boston Red Sox and Cleveland Indians
Ron Yary (born 1946), first selection of 1968 NFL Draft, member of College and Pro Football Hall of Fames

References

High schools in Los Angeles County, California
Bellflower, California
Public high schools in California
Public middle schools in California
1951 establishments in California
Educational institutions established in 1951